"Got to Give It Up" is a song by American music artist Marvin Gaye. Written by the singer and produced by Art Stewart as a response to a request from Gaye's record label that he perform disco music, it was released in March 1977.

Upon its release, it topped three different Billboard charts, including the Hot 100, and became a worldwide success. Gaye sometimes used the song to open his concerts. The song has been covered by several acts.

Background
Throughout 1976, Gaye's popularity was still at a high in America and abroad, but the singer struggled throughout the year due to pending lawsuits from former bandmates. Divorce court proceedings between Gaye and first wife Anna Gordy had also put a strain on him. Financial difficulties almost led to imprisonment for the singer when Gordy accused him of failing to pay child support payments for their only child, son Marvin Pentz Gaye III.

To relieve Gaye from his debt, his European concert promoter Jeffrey Kruger booked the singer on a lengthy European tour. Gaye began the tour in the United Kingdom where he had a strong fan base dating back to his early career in the 1960s, making his first stop in the country since 1964. His performances there were given rave reviews. One of the shows, filmed at London's Palladium, was recorded for a live album, later released as Live at the London Palladium, in the spring of 1977. 

Around the same time, Gaye's label Motown tried to get him to record disco music, which was popular and commercially viable at the time. Gaye criticized the genre, however, claiming it lacked substance, and refused to record a disco album. His label mate Diana Ross had recorded "Love Hangover", her first disco song. The song's producer Hal Davis debated over giving that song to either Ross or Gaye. After working over the song, he went with Ross, and it became her fourth solo number one hit. Motown struggled to get Gaye in the studio as Gaye focused on work on an album (which later was released as Here, My Dear, dedicated to Gaye's troubled first marriage). After months of holding off from recording anything resembling disco, the singer set upon writing a song parodying a disco setting.

Production
The first recording session for "Got to Give It Up", originally titled "Dancing Lady", was on December 13, 1976. Influenced by Johnnie Taylor's hit "Disco Lady", Gaye was inspired to create his answer song to Taylor's hit. To help set up a "disco" atmosphere, Gaye hired Motown producer and engineer Art Stewart to oversee the song's production. Gaye and Stewart brought in several musicians and Gaye's friends, his brother Frankie, and girlfriend Janis Hunter to Marvin's Room, Gaye's recording studio complex. From December 14 to 17, 1976, Gaye performed the lead vocal track, instrumentation (which included Gaye, Fernando Harkness, Johnny McGhee, Frankie Beverly and Bugsy Wilcox and Funk Brother member Jack Ashford) and background vocals. In the song, Gaye added background vocals from his brother and his girlfriend. During the second half of the song, the song introduces vocal layered doo-wop styled scatting from Gaye and produced a funk-influenced vamp. Fernando Harkness performs a tenor saxophone solo in the second half of the song.

Gaye recorded his vocals on the first date of sessions, adding instrumentation on the following day, and then adding other effects in the latter two days, mixing it by January 1977. Influenced by the vocal chatter on his previous hit "What's Going On", Gaye decided to create a party scene outside the recording studio where different voices are heard either greeting each other or partying. Gaye is heard on the track greeting people and laughing while mingling in with the crowd. During the bridge, Gaye is heard yelling "Say Don! Hey man, I didn't know you was in here!" The "Don" later was confirmed as Soul Train host Don Cornelius, who was one of Gaye's close friends. Gaye overlapped the party sounds over and over, making a loop. In the second half of the song, Gaye sings mainly the initial title, "dancing lady" over and over while a saxophone is playing a solo. All the background vocals on the second part of the song were from Gaye. He also played percussion, bass keyboards and RMI synthesisers in the final fade of the song. In the second half, he can be heard playing on a glass bottle halfway filled with grapefruit juice. L.T.D. guitarist Johnny McGhee added guitar. McGhee and Frankie Beverly were the only non-bandmates featured on the song playing instruments. Beverly also added assorted percussion.

Composition
After the start of the song, which includes vocal chatter, the song kicks off with a standard drum beat: kick, snare and hi-hat, and synthesizers are heard soon afterward. After nearly a minute, Gaye's vocals appear in a falsetto, which he sings in for most of the song. In the second half, after harmonizing in falsetto, Gaye's tenor vocals take over.

The song's story focuses on a man who is a wallflower when he comes into a nightclub nervous to perform on the dance floor. But after a minute of this, the music takes over and his body starts to lose any inhibitions. Midway, he finally cuts loose before shouting the chant "non-stop express, party y'all; feel no distress, I'm at my best — let's dance, let's shout, gettin' funky what it's all about!" proving the power of the dance can overtake any shyness. The dance is focused on Gaye and a suitable female partner he seeks. In the second half, a funkier jazz arrangement is helped in guitar, bass and a tambourine. After this, he continues chanting until the song fades.

Release and reaction
The record was released in March 1977 and eventually topped the U.S. Billboard charts. The song held the number one position on the US Billboard Hot 100 for one week, from June 18 to 25, 1977. It replaced "Dreams" by Fleetwood Mac, and was replaced by "Gonna Fly Now" by Bill Conti. On the R&B singles charts, it held the number one spot for five weeks from April 30 until June 17, 1977 (being interrupted twice at the number one position for one week by "Whodunit" by Tavares for the week of May 21, 1977, and Stevie Wonder's "Sir Duke" for the week of May 28, 1977, respectively). On the disco charts, the single was a number one hit. Billboard ranked it as the No. 20 song of 1977.

It reached number one on the dance charts in May. The single also found success outside the United States reaching number seven on the UK Singles Chart, his biggest charted hit as a solo artist since his version of "Abraham, Martin & John" had peaked at number nine on the chart in 1970. Previously, Gaye had modest success with two singles: "Save the Children" (released as a double-A side with Gaye's 1966 recording "Little Darling (I Need You)") in 1971 and "Let's Get It On" in 1973 (which peaked at number 31 on the UK chart). The single also found modest success in some countries, peaking at number 24 on the Dutch singles chart and number 31 on the New Zealand charts. The single's success helped its parent album Live at the London Palladium find substantial success on the Billboard 200, where it stayed at the top 10 for several weeks. Sales of the album eventually reached two million.

Cash Box said that "this highly infectious tune features Gaye's vocals over throbbing drums and street jive noise that has a sound just right for the disco, and tailor made for an upbeat mood." Record World said that it's "an atmospheric party track sparked by [Gaye's] distinctive vocal." New York Times critic John Rockwell called the song "a pure dance record in the modern disco mode" but wondered if its popularity was due more to Gaye's reputation than to its own merits.

Legacy

Gaye's song became an important influence and motivation for Michael Jackson, who was searching to write a potential hit after the Jacksons had struggled with previous offerings. Jackson later wrote, with brother Randy, "Shake Your Body (Down to the Ground)", adapting parts of Gaye's chant, transforming it into "let's dance, let's shout, shake your body down to the ground". The song "Don't Stop 'til You Get Enough", written solely by Jackson and recorded the same year as "Shake Your Body", took even more of Gaye's approach with "Got to Give It Up", using percussive instruments and a continued funk guitar riff. Jackson sings most of the song in falsetto. Jackson's producer Quincy Jones added in string instruments used during the instrumental intro and a synthesizer guitar during the song's bridge. Much like the party chatter in "Got to Give It Up", Jones added in vocal chatter; however, the chatter later was debated as two people having a verbal argument while the tape was recording (a woman could be heard hollering "I love your little ass anyway!"). Jones allowed the argument in the recording.

"Got to Give It Up" has been featured in the films Menace II Society (1993), Boogie Nights (1997), Practical Magic (1998), Summer of Sam (1999), Charlie's Angels (2000), Barbershop (2002), This Christmas (2007), Eat Pray Love (2010), Paul (2011), and Da 5 Bloods (2020).

The song was featured in the television shows The Wire, True Blood, and Scandal.

The 2013 hit single "Blurred Lines" by Robin Thicke, Pharrell Williams and song co-writer T.I. was the subject of a lawsuit for allegedly copying "Got to Give It Up". Thicke originally told the public both he and Williams were in the recording studio, and suddenly Thicke told Pharrell "Damn, we should make something like that, something with that groove" and they wrote the song in less than an hour. However, Thicke later claimed this was all a lie, and the song was written entirely by Pharrell. Thicke stated "I was high on Vicodin and alcohol when I showed up at the studio." On March 10, 2015, a federal jury found "Blurred Lines" infringed on "Got to Give It Up" and awarded nearly $7.4 million to Gaye's children. Jurors found against Williams and Thicke, but held harmless the record company and T.I. While damages were reduced to $5.3 million, the jury's decision was upheld on appeal. As an additional remedy, Gaye was credited as a songwriter for "Blurred Lines". This in turn affected "Weird Al" Yankovic's parody of "Blurred Lines", titled "Word Crimes", where Gaye has been added as a songwriter.

Personnel
 Written and composed by Marvin Gaye
 Produced and engineered by Art Stewart
 Mixing by Art Stewart and Marvin Gaye
 Marvin Gaye: Lead Vocals, RMI synthesizer bass, keyboards, percussion, bottle
 Johnny McGhee: guitar
 Gordon Banks: guitar (Part II)
 Fernando Harkness: saxophone
 Bugsy Wilcox: drums
 Jack Ashford: tambourine
 Frankie Gaye: background vocals (Part I)
 Janis Gaye: background vocals (Part I)
 Vocal, rhythm and synthesizer arrangement by Marvin Gaye
 Background vocals by Marvin Gaye (Part II)

Charts

Certifications

Aaliyah version

American singer Aaliyah recorded a cover version of the song for her second studio album One in a Million (1996). It featured a guest appearance from rapper Slick Rick, and was released as the album's second single outside North America on November 4, 1996.

Recording and production 
Aaliyah decided to record "Got to Give It Up" because she wanted to have party songs on the album. In an interview Aaliyah stated "I wanted some real party songs, so when my uncle played me that [original track], I thought of how I could make it different. Slick Rick [who had been in jail] was on work release at the time, so Vincent got him on the song". Producer Craig King recalls that when Aaliyah was recording "Got to Give It Up" she was dancing the entire time.

During the recording process of the song the producers sat for hours writing down the lyrics because they did not know them. King stated: "To me, the funniest part was trying to figure out the lyrics. Marvin Gaye sang in such a crazy way, a lot of words we didn't know. We had to sit there for hours making sure we were writing it down properly. We still think we might've gotten some words wrong." Also during the recording process the producers changed about five words in the song so that they could fit for Aaliyah. The overall goal while recording the song was to make it fit in within the current time as the producers did not want it to sound too dated. According to King, "We didn't want it to sound like it was from the '70s so we changed some lyrics because some of the words just wouldn't work in the '90s like 'suga mama.'" Aaliyah was proud to cover this song, and she said "I don't know how Marvin Gaye fans will react, but I hope they like it. I always think it's a great compliment when people remake songs. I hope one day after I'm not here that people will cover my songs".

Music and lyrics
On "Got to Give It Up", Aaliyah places her falsetto "toe to toe against the liquid overlapping rhyme scheme of hip hop's ultimate storyteller Slick Rick". According to Bob Waliszewski from Plugged In, the song lyrically is about finding "a man in a dance club ordering alcohol". Aaliyah's version of the song features a sample from Michael Jackson's song "Billie Jean".

Critical reception
When reviewing One in a Million, writer Dream Hampton from Vibe was shocked with the outcome of Aaliyah's cover version of "Got to Give It Up". According to Hampton, "The album has some surprises too. Like any self respecting Marvin Gaye fan, I cringed when I learned Aaliyah had covered his classic 1977 party jam "Got to Give It Up". But her version is agreeably accurate (even with Slick Rick's snippet of an intro)". Hampton also wrote that Aaliyah was just as convincing as Gaye when it comes to the song's theme of being a wallflower. Connie Johnson from the Los Angeles Times wrote that Aaliyah's skills were being displayed on the song and that her version of "Got to Give It Up" was irresistible. Dean Van Nguyen from The Independent praised Aaliyah's voice on the song, writing that she sounded great. Joe Lynch from Billboard, praised Aaliyah's ability to "serve as a dancefloor siren on this one, which puts “Blurred Lines" to shame".

Commercial performance
"Got to Give It Up" was a minor hit in the United Kingdom, peaking at number 37 on the UK Singles Chart and within the top ten on the R&B and dance charts. In New Zealand, the song peaked at number 34.

Track listings and formats
Maxi CD single
"Got to Give It Up" (radio edit) – 4:15
"Got to Give It Up" (TNT's House Mix) – 6:58
"No Days Go By" – 4:41
"Got to Give It Up" (Tee's Freeze Radio) – 3:34

Cassette single
"Got to Give It Up" (radio edit) – 4:15
"No Days Go By" – 4:41

12-inch vinyl
"Got to Give It Up" (radio edit) – 4:15
"Got to Give It Up" (album version) – 4:41
"Got to Give It Up" (Tee's Freeze Club) – 6:42
"Got to Give It Up" (TNT's House Mix) – 6:58

Charts

Release history

Recordings by other artists
The song has been featured in several films and soundtracks since its release, including the soundtracks to films such as 54, Summer of Sam and The Nanny Diaries; it was featured in the films Charlie's Angels, How Stella Got Her Groove Back, Menace 2 Society and Barbershop. Justin Timberlake performed the song live at the 2008 Fashion Rocks concert. Gaye's daughter Nona recorded an unreleased version with Prince's band New Power Generation. Zhane performed this song on a tribute album of various artists titled Marvin Is 60. The song was performed by Thom Yorke's band Atoms for Peace during a live concert performance.

References

1977 singles
1996 singles
1997 singles
Billboard Hot 100 number-one singles
Cashbox number-one singles
Funk songs
Marvin Gaye songs
Songs written by Marvin Gaye
Aaliyah songs
Songs involved in plagiarism controversies
1976 songs
Tamla Records singles
Blackground Records singles
Atlantic Records singles
Songs about dancing
Live singles
Song recordings produced by Art Stewart